Senator Emerson may refer to:

James A. Emerson (1865–1922), New York State Senate
Lee E. Emerson (1898–1976), Vermont State Senate
Louis W. Emerson (1857–1924), New York State Senate
Robert L. Emerson (born 1948), Michigan State Senate
Bill Emmerson (born 1945), California State Senate